Raoping railway station is a railway station located in Gaotang Town, Raoping County, Guangdong Province, China, on the Xiamen–Shenzhen railway operated by the Guangzhou Railway (Group) Corp., China Railway Corporation.

References 

Railway stations in Guangdong